Amata lateralis is a species of moth of the family Erebidae. It was described by Jean Baptiste Boisduval in 1836. It is found in Senegal.

References

 

lateralis
Moths described in 1836
Moths of Africa